Witching & Bitching is a 2013 Spanish comedy horror film co-written and directed by Álex de la Iglesia. It stars Hugo Silva, Mario Casas, and Carmen Maura.

It won the most awards at the 28th Goya Awards with eight wins out of ten nominations, primarily in technical categories.

Plot
The film opens with two men, José and Antonio robbing a pawn shop in Madrid. Antonio is unhappy that José has brought his son Sergio along on the heist and is even unhappier that the child is participating with them, as this puts both him and them at risk. The robbery turns sour and several people die in the resulting gunfire. The men hijack a taxi and stow its unwilling passenger in the trunk, then force the driver, Manuel, to drive towards Spain's border with the intent to flee to France.

The group is followed by Sergio's mother and José's ex Silvia as well as two police investigators Pacheco and Calvo, who are tracking Silvia. The men end up in Zugarramurdi, Navarre, where they come across a group of cannibalistic witches led by Graciana, whose mother Maritxu tries to cook Sergio in her oven. They manage to escape the witches once but are forced to turn back, and they are thereby swiftly captured by the witches.

Silvia manages to find the witches' house, enlisting the help of the cops to break into the house. José, Antonio, and Manuel end up escaping in the ensuing chaos, however Silvia and the two cops are captured, with Silvia turned into a witch with the use of tainted toad juice. The three men are captured by the witches except for José, who survives only through the intervention of Graciana's daughter Eva, who has become infatuated with him. She demands that he leave with her right away, yet José refuses to leave his son behind. With help from Eva's brother Luismi, José finds its way to the ritual chamber. Along the way they free Eva, who had been buried alive by her mother for her betrayal.

Already in the chamber, Luismi and José are witness to Antonio, Manuel, Pacheco, and Calvo slowly burning in a pyre and the emergence of Graciana's goddess, a grotesque gargantuan woman resembling a fertility statue. The goddess devours Sergio, who passes through the giant and emerges alive. José confronts the witches with the help of Eva, who manages to cause the goddess's destruction, and José manages to escape the chaos with Sergio, Eva, and the other men. One month José and Eva are shown to be a couple raising Sergio, who is growing into his powers, yet Silvia, Graciana, and Maritxu are shown to be all alive and are content to wait for the couple to grow discontent with their happiness.

Cast

Release 
Distributed by Universal Pictures International Spain, the film was theatrically released in Spain on 27 September 2013, opening with €1,236,390 in its debut weekend (a 21% share of the entire box office).

Reception

On Rotten Tomatoes the film holds a rating of 84%  based on 31 reviews. The site's the consensus states: "Dark, nasty, and delightfully subversive, Witching and Bitching is gross-out genre fun with a heaping helping of warped comedy for good measure". On Metacritic it has a score of 73% based on reviews from 10 critics.

Accolades 

|-
| align = "center" rowspan = "18" | 2014 || 1st Feroz Awards || colspan = "2" | Best Comedy Film ||  || 
|-
| rowspan = "10" | 28th Goya Awards || Best Original Score || Joan Valent ||  || align = "center" rowspan = "10" | 
|-
| Best Supporting Actress || Terele Pávez ||  
|-
| Best Production Supervision || Carlos Bernases ||  
|-
| Best Cinematography || Kiko de la Rica ||  
|-
| Best Editing || Pablo Blanco ||  
|-
| Best Art Direction || Arturo García "Biaffra", José Luis Arrizabalaga "Arri" || 
|-
| Best Costume Design || Francisco Delgado López ||  
|-
| Best Makeup and Hairstyles || María Dolores Gómez Castro, Javier Hernández Valentín, Pedro Rodríguez "Pedrati", Francisco J. Rodríguez Frías || 
|-
| Best Sound || Charly Schmukler, Nicolás de Poulpiquet ||  
|-
| Best Special Effects || Juan Ramón Molina, Ferran Piquer || 
|-
| rowspan = "2" | 1st Platino Awards || colspan = "2" | Best Ibero-American Film ||  || rowspan = "2" | 
|-
| Best Original Score || Joan Valent || 
|-
| rowspan = "5" | 1st Fénix Awards || Best Costume Design || Paco Delgado ||  || rowspan = "5" | 
|-
| Best Art Direction || José Luis Arrizabalaga, Arturo García || 
|-
| Best Sound || Carlos Schmukler, Nicolás de Poulpiquet || 
|-
| Best Music || Joan Valent || 
|-
| Best Editing || Pablo Blanco || 
|}

See also
 List of Spanish films of 2013
 Basque witch trials

References

External links
 
 

2013 films
2013 comedy horror films
Films about cannibalism
Films directed by Álex de la Iglesia
Films about witchcraft
Films with screenplays by Jorge Guerricaechevarría
Spanish comedy horror films
2010s Spanish-language films
2010s Spanish films
Enrique Cerezo PC films